Centorisoma is a genus of frit flies in the family Chloropidae. There are at least 20 described species in Centorisoma.

Species
These 21 species belong to the genus Centorisoma:

 Centorisoma arsenjevi Nartshuk, 1965 c g
 Centorisoma convexum g
 Centorisoma divisum g
 Centorisoma elegantulum Becker, 1910 c g
 Centorisoma flavum Nartshuk, 1965 c g
 Centorisoma helanshanensis g
 Centorisoma koreanum Nartshuk, 2005 c g
 Centorisoma kozlovi Nartshuk, 1965 c g
 Centorisoma kyushuense Kanmiya, 1983 c g
 Centorisoma mediconvexum g
 Centorisoma mongolicum Nartshuk, 1968 c g
 Centorisoma neimengguensis g
 Centorisoma nigriaristatum Yang & Yang, 1992 c g
 Centorisoma nishijimai Kanmiya, 1983 c g
 Centorisoma obscuripenne Nartshuk, 1965 c g
 Centorisoma pentagonium g
 Centorisoma scutatum g
 Centorisoma sexangulatum g
 Centorisoma shaanxiensis g
 Centorisoma subdivitis Nartshuk, 2006 c g
 Centorisoma ussuriense Nartshuk, 1965 c g

Data sources: i = ITIS, c = Catalogue of Life, g = GBIF, b = Bugguide.net

References

Further reading

External links

 

Chloropinae
Chloropidae genera